Heinrich Herzig (1887–1964) was a Swiss painter.

References
This article was initially translated from the German Wikipedia.

20th-century Swiss painters
Swiss male painters
1887 births
1964 deaths
20th-century Swiss male artists